St Bartholomew's Church, Sealand, is in Sealand, Flintshire, Wales and in the diocese of St Asaph  The church is designated as a Grade II listed building.

History
The church was built between 1865 and 1867 to a design by the Chester architect John Douglas.  It was one of Douglas's earliest churches and is in the High Victorian style of Gothic Revival architecture.  The site for the church was given by the River Dee Company who also partly paid for it.  It was consecrated on 15 October 1867.

Architecture and contents

The church is built in sandstone from Helsby, Cheshire.  Its plan consists of a nave and a chancel, with a small north transept to contain the organ and a tower on the south side of the chancel containing a vestry.  The church is without aisles and is "not large, but expensively done" with an ashlar interior.  The tower has a pyramid spire and a turret against its lower part.  The stained glass in the east window of 1867 is by Hardman & Co. and was donated by Douglas.  The stained glass in the west window dates from 1880 and is by Kempe.

See also
List of new churches by John Douglas

References

Further reading

Churches completed in 1867
Sealand
Sealand
Sealand
John Douglas buildings
Sealand